The Bombers de Barcelona (English: Firefighters of Barcelona) is the fire and rescue service for the city of Barcelona, Catalonia, Spain. The service was founded in 1825 as the La Companyia de Bombers (Company of Firemen), consisting of 25 men. The Barcelona City Council took control of the fire service in 1839.

The service consists of seven stations and 425 firefighters and officers.

See also 
 Guàrdia Urbana de Barcelona
 Corps of Firefighters of Catalonia

References

External links 
 

1825 establishments in Spain
Fire departments
Organisations based in Barcelona
Government agencies established in 1839
Government of Barcelona